Warhol-o-rama is a book of American poetry that examines the life—and robust afterlife—of the artist Andy Warhol (1928–1987).

A poetic sequence by Peter Oresick, it employs techniques of multiple perspective and Warholian parody and appropriation, often to humorous effect. The sequence draws heavily from source material in the archives of the Andy Warhol Museum as well as a large body of mythology surrounding the pop art icon to render a postmodern serial portrait of Warhol.

The book was published on 6 August 2008, the occasion of Andy Warhol's 80th birthday, by the university press at Carnegie Mellon University, of which Warhol was an alumnus.

See also
Songs for Drella

References

External links
 Book Website for Warhol-o-rama
 Essay by Oresick on Warhol's 80th birthday and the publication of Warhol-o-rama
 Interview with Oresick about Warhol in Pop City Magazine (http://www.popcitymedia.com)
 Garrison Keillor reads from Warhol-o-rama on The Writer's Almanac
 Review of Warhol-o-rama in City Paper
 Interview with Oresick about Warhol in The University Times
  Book Page @ Amazon.com

2008 poetry books
Andy Warhol
American poems
American poetry collections